Caleta is a genus of butterflies in the family Lycaenidae, mainly found in Southeast Asia. The common name Pierrot is used for some species.

Species
In his generic classification of the Polyommatini, Toshiya Hirowatari included nine species in Caleta:
Caleta argola (Hewitson), [1876] Philippine Islands
Caleta caleta (Hewitson), [1876]
Caleta celebensis (Staudinger), 1889
Caleta decidia (Hewitson), [1876]
Caleta elna (Hewitson), [1876]
Caleta manovus (Fruhstorfer), 1918 Borneo
Caleta mindarus (C. & R. Felder), [1865] New Guinea, New Britain
Caleta rhode (Hopffer), 1871 Lesser Sunda Islands, Sulawesi, Buru, Banggai, Timor
Caleta roxus (Godart), [1824]

Ecology
Recorded host plants include Ziziphus oenoplia (Rhamnaceae).

Taxonomy
The genus Caleta was erected by Hans Fruhstorfer in 1922 in Adalbert Seitz's Die Gross-Schmetterlinge der Erde (The Macrolepidoptera of the World).

Another genus-level name, Pycnophallium, was erected by the Dutch lepidopterist Lambertus Johannes Toxopeus in 1929. He included two Oriental species under this name: Pycnophallium roxus Godart and Pycnophallium elna Hewitson. These species had previously been treated as species in the genera Lycaena or Castalius until Hans Fruhstorfer erected Caleta in 1922. Although Caleta in the wide sense has not been fully revised since Fruhstorfer erected it, Hirowatari, 1992, made an authoritative classification of Oriental polyommatine genera. Hirowatari did not recognise Pycnophallium as a valid genus, but retained nine species, including roxus and elna in Caleta.

References

External links

Caleta at Markku Savela's website on Lepidoptera
Images representing Caleta at BOLD

 
Lycaenidae genera